The 2019 Yukon Men's Curling Championship, the territorial men's curling championship for Yukon was held February 7 to 10 at the Whitehorse Curling Club in Whitehorse, Yukon. The winning Jon Solberg team represented the Yukon at the 2019 Tim Hortons Brier, Canada's national men's curling championship.

Teams
Three teams entered the event:

Draw
As there were three teams that entered, the event was a double round robin. If any team had gone undefeated, they would be declared the champions. However, since no team went undefeated a playoff between the top two teams occurred.

Round robin standings

Scores

February 7
Draw 1
Paslawski 8–5 Scoffin

February 8
Draw 2
Solberg 11–4 Paslawski

Draw 3
Solberg 8–6 Scoffin

February 9
Draw 4
Solberg 9–8 Paslawski

Draw 5
Scoffin 8–3 Paslawski

Draw 6
Scoffin 6–3 Solberg

Playoff
Solberg must be beaten twice.

Semifinal
Sunday, February 10, 9:00am

Final
A final was not necessary as Solberg won the semifinal.

References

External links
Results on CurlingZone

2019 Tim Hortons Brier
Men's Curling Championship, 2019
Sport in Whitehorse
Men's Curling Championship
February 2019 sports events in Canada